This is a list of supper clubs. A supper club is a traditional dining establishment that also functions as a social club. The term may describe different establishments depending on the region, but in general, supper clubs tend to present themselves as having a high-class image, even if the price is affordable to all. A newer usage of the term supper club has emerged, referring to underground restaurants.

Supper clubs are more formal than casual restaurants and bars.

Supper clubs
 500 Club – a former a nightclub and supper club at 6 Missouri Avenue in Atlantic City, New Jersey, United States that and operated from the 1930s until the building burned down in 1973. The 500 Club became one of the most popular nightspots on the East Coast, regularly attracting top-name talent. Performers included Frank Sinatra, Sammy Davis, Jr., Martin and Lewis, the Will Mastin Trio, Jimmy Durante, Eartha Kitt, Sophie Tucker, the Jackie Paris Trio, Milton Berle, Nat King Cole, and Liberace, among many others.

 Babette's – also known as Babette's Supper Club, it was a supper club and bar at 2211 Pacific Avenue on the Boardwalk of Atlantic City, New Jersey. It operated from the early 1920s onwards and was sold in 1950. The bar was designed like a ship's hull. In the backroom was a gambling den, which was investigated by the federal authorities and raided in 1943.
 Bagdad Supper Club – a theater and entertainment venue located on north side of what then was U.S. Route 80, but now is U.S. Route 180, east of Grand Prairie, Texas, at the corner of Bagdad Road and Main Street, it opened Thanksgiving Day 1928 and was an opulent palatial facility that offered dining, dancing, and music.
 Catalina Bar & Grill – also called Catalina Jazz Club, it is a prominent jazz club and restaurant on Sunset Boulevard in Hollywood, Los Angeles, California
 Chez Ami Supper Club – also called The Chez Ami, it was a former supper club located at 311 Delaware Avenue in Buffalo, New York that opened 1934. The interior of Chez Ami was designed by C. Theodore Macheras who used art-deco elements of mirrors, neon, indirect lighting and plush carpeting to achieve a modern entertainment experience. The centerpiece of Chez Ami was a revolving bar, purported to be the first of its kind in America, and- took 7 ½ minutes to make a complete cycle.
 Club Saint-Germain – a former jazz club located at 13 rue Saint-Benoît in the 6e arrondissement de Paris, it was opened in 1947 by Boris Vian and staged central figures in the French jazz scene such as Barney Wilen, René Urtreger, Django Reinhardt, and Pierre Michelot throughout the 1940s, 1950s, and 1960s. The building of the defunct Club Saint-Germain is now home to the supper club Bilboquet.
 Evans Music-and-Supper Rooms – a former entertainment venue for music and singing in early nineteenth century that was located at 43 King Street, Covent Garden, London, England. 
 The Fainting Club – a members-only supper club for women founded in 2014 by artist Zoe Crosher, it started in Los Angeles and now has chapters worldwide including in New York, Mexico City, London, Berlin, Paris and Hong Kong.
 
 The Gobbler –  a former motel, supper club, and roadside attraction in Johnson Creek, Wisconsin, United States. It was designed in the late 1960s by Fort Atkinson architect Helmut Ajango for local poultry processor Clarence Hartwig and opened in 1967. It included a rotating circular bar that completed one revolution every 80 minutes. The Gobbler was reopened in December 2015 as the Gobbler Theater.
 Gus Stevens Seafood Restaurant & Buccaneer Lounge – a former restaurant and supper club in Biloxi, Mississippi, its restaurant building was constructed with a Moroccan architecture style turret. It was famous in the 1950s and 1960s and hosted many famous entertainers, including Andy Griffith, Mel Torme, Rudy Vallee, and Jerry Lee Lewis.  It is also well known as the last place where Jayne Mansfield performed; she died early the next morning in a car crash while being driven from the club.
 Metropolitan Opera Club – a private social club within the Metropolitan Opera House in New York that was founded in 1893 and incorporated in 1899. The Club maintains its own dining room that was designed by Angelo Donghia and later renovated by Peter Pennoyer. The Club was founded in 1893 when a collection of New York Society gentlemen created a private supper club in a lobby of the old Metropolitan Opera House on West 39th Street while the back of the house was under renovation after a fire.  Known as the "Vaudeville Club", members and their guests dined and watched performances from a miniature stage designed by Stanford White, a founding member.
 Pigalle Club – a former supper club and live music venue in Piccadilly, London, owned by John Vincent Power. It closed in 2012.
 Pith – a former supper club in New York City that was open from September 2015 until May 31, 2016.

 Shore Club – located in Hubbards, Nova Scotia and was opened in 1946, it purveys the "Original Nova Scotian Lobster Supper"
 Smoke Jazz & Supper-Club Lounge – an influential jazz club based on the Upper West Side of New York City, it was founded on April 9, 1999
 Song and supper room – a former dining club in Victorian England in which entertainment and good food were provided.  They provided an alternative to formal theatre and music hall with a good convivial atmosphere in which the customers were encouraged to perform themselves.
 Time Supper Club – the first supper club in Montreal, Quebec, Canada, it gradually turned into a night club
 Triad Theatre – formerly known as Palsson's Supper Club, Steve McGraw's, and Stage 72 it is a performing arts venue located on West 72nd Street on New York's Upper West Side
 Volxkuche, VoKu, peoples kitchen, free supper club and kitchen for all are names used by the alternative scene (left) for a weekly or regularly occurring group cooking event, at which the meal is served free of charge or at cost. The name derives from the German expression “people's kitchen” (soup kitchen), as a secular counterpart of the Christian soup kitchen.

See also

 AirDine – a supper club mobile app based on the sharing economy principles where individuals stand as both supplier and customer, similar to Airbnb in the short time rental market.
 Lists of restaurants

References

 
Lists of restaurants